Tortyra hyalozona is a moth of the family Choreutidae. It is known from Colombia.

References

Tortyra
Moths described in 1912